NWA Mid-America was a professional wrestling promotion territory under the umbrella of the National Wrestling Alliance (NWA) that promoted shows in Tennessee, Kentucky and Alabama from the 1940s until 1981. The company was founded in the 1940s by Nick Gulas and Roy Welch and was one of the first promotions to join the NWA after it was founded in 1948. From 1953 until late 1974, John Cazana promoted the Knoxville area and Joe Gunther promoted the Birmingham area from around 1940 until some point in the 1970s. In 1977, promoter Jerry Jarrett and wrestler Jerry Lawler broke away from NWA Mid-America, breaking the Memphis area off to start on the own under the name the Continental Wrestling Association (CWA). Mid-America stopped promoting in 1981 and the CWA took over most of their territory as well as some of the championships promoted by NWA Mid-America

History
In the 1940s, wrestler and promoter Roy Welch started promoting shows on a regular basis in and around Memphis, Tennessee and would later be joined by Nick Gulas who had been promoting shows in Florida between 1945 and 1947 before joining with Welch to create the Gulas Welch Enterprises Inc. company in the mid 1940s as they began promoting shows primarily in Memphis and Nashville with occasional shows in Chattanooga, Jackson, Louisville, Kentucky, Lexington, Kentucky, Bowling Green, Kentucky. They also worked with Joe Gunther, a promoter working out of Birmingham, Alabama to expand their promotion into Alabama as well as occasional shows in Mississippi, Ohio, West Virginia, Missouri, Georgia and North Carolina. In 1949, The group joined the National Wrestling Alliance, a national sanctioning body that divided the US into territories. The promotion became known as the NWA Mid-America. In 1953, they added Knoxville, Tennessee to their territory as promoter John Cazana joined the group. The group recognized a number of NWA "World" Championships that were shared across the territories as well as promoting their own NWA branded championships that were mainly defended in the Mid-America territory.

Over the years tag team wrestling became very popular in the Mid-America territory leading to seven different tag team championships being recognized at the same time in the 1970s by NWA Mid-America: NWA World Tag Team Championship, NWA United States Tag Team Championship, NWA Southern Tag Team Championship, NWA Mid-America Tag Team Championship, NWA Tennessee Tag Team Championship, NWA Kentucky Tag Team Championship and the NWA Tri-State Tag Team Championship. This also meant that a host of well known tag teams either worked in NWA Mid-America on a regular basis or passed through the territory at one point, teams such as The Von Brauners, The Interns, The Infernos, The Bounty Hunters, Tojo Yamamoto and Jerry Jarrett, The Heavenly Bodies (Don and Al Green), Bobby Hart and Lorenzo Parente, The Fabulous Kangaroos, Jerry Lawler and Jim White, The Fabulous Fargos, and a host of other teams were regulars.

In the mid-1970s, the territory was split as Memphis promoter Jerry Jarrett broke away from the Mid-America territory due to disagreements over how Gulas was promoting his son George Gulas, pushing him as one of the top names in the promotion despite not being very talented in the ring. Many of the wrestlers in the promotion were upset at Nick Gulas for over-booking his son George Gulas in the extremely profitable Memphis half of the territory. At this point Roy Welch retired from promotion, leaving Nick Gulas as the man in charge of a dwindling territory. With Gulas' insistence on pushing his son and Jarrett's Continental Wrestling Association (CWA) becoming very popular led to a drop in ticket sales and by 1981, Gulas closed the promotion and sold the territory and its championships to the CWA.

Last show
These are the results of the last known NWA Mid-America show held on September 13, 1980.

Championships

Further reading

NWA Mid-America in Memphis

NWA Mid-America in Tennessee

NWA Mid-America in Nashville

See also
List of National Wrestling Alliance territories
List of independent wrestling promotions in the United States

References

External links

 
Independent professional wrestling promotions based in Tennessee
Entertainment companies disestablished in 1981
National Wrestling Alliance members
Professional wrestling in Alabama
Professional wrestling in Kentucky